The Haima S5 Young is a subcompact crossover produced by Haima Automobile positioned under the Haima S5 compact crossover. Haima S5 Young SUV is smaller than the Haima S5 SUV, stands on a different platform, uses different engines, and sells in a lower segment.

Overview

The price range of the Haima S5 Young crossover ranges from 75,800 yuan to 79,800 yuan. The Haima S5 Young was formerly known as the Haima S3 during development phase. Power of the Haima S5 Young comes from a 122hp 1.6-litre engine mated to a six-speed manual transmission or a 163hp 1.5-litre turbo engine mated to a CVT.

References

External links

Haima Official Website 

Haima vehicles
Crossover sport utility vehicles
Front-wheel-drive vehicles
Cars introduced in 2017
Cars of China